Vladimir Tadej (9 May 1925 – 1 March 2017) was a Croatian production designer, screenwriter and film director. He contributed to more than forty films from 1949 to 1998.

Selected filmography

References

External links 

1925 births
2017 deaths
People from Novska
Croatian film directors
Croatian screenwriters
Croatian production designers